The SSN-AUKUS  is a planned class of nuclear-powered fleet submarine (SSN) intended to enter service with the United Kingdom's Royal Navy in the late 2030s and Royal Australian Navy in the 2040s. The class will replace the UK's  and Australia's  submarines.

The UK commenced an Astute class replacement project in 2018 that assessed requirements and considered options known as the Maritime Underwater Future Capability (MUFC) that was later renamed the Submersible Ship Nuclear Replacement (SSNR). The SSNR design was renamed SSN-AUKUS in March 2023, under the AUKUS trilateral security pact, when Australia joined the programme and additional US technology was incorporated into the design. Australia plans to build eight SSN-AUKUS submarines in addition to acquiring three nuclear-powered  submarines from the United States.

The class will be powered by Rolls-Royce's pressurised water reactors (PWR).

Development
The initial concept phase of the programme was scheduled to last for three years. This phase had begun in early 2018 but was suspended for two years due to delays in the Astute-class and  delivery programmes. In 2020, the Ministry of Defence recruited for a Submarine Delivery Agency Project Manager to work on the SSNR design and development process.

In March 2021, the government's defence paper Defence in a Competitive Age committed to funding the SSNR project. This was followed in September 2021 by an investment of £170 million by the government in the form of two £85 million contracts to BAE Systems and Rolls-Royce Holdings for early design work on the SSNR. The investment will support 350 jobs for the UK economy. 

In November 2022, MSubs Ltd was awarded a £15.4m contract to build an XLUUV (Extra Large Uncrewed Underwater Vehicle) vessel which is to be delivered to the Royal Navy within two years. The 17-tonne vessel (known as Project CETUS) is described as being "the next step in developing autonomous underwater warfare capability" and is also to feed into the design of SSNR.

In January 2023 it was reported that the submarines were likely to incorporate a vertical launch system (VLS) for land-attack missiles. This would be a first for Royal Navy SSNs, which currently launch land-attack missiles via their torpedo tubes. A VLS system was described as likely to increase interoperability options with the US Navy since future US land attack missiles may not have a horizontal launch option.

AUKUS 
Following an 18 month consultation starting in September 2021, the design was renamed SSN-AUKUS in March 2023 when Australia joined the programme and additional US technology was incorporated, both as part of the AUKUS agreement. The British Prime Minister Rishi Sunak announced in March 2023 that the UK would boost defense spending by additional £5 billion over two years, some of which would go towards funding "the next phase of the AUKUS submarine programme."  

The first SSN-AUKUS class boat for the Royal Navy will commence construction in Barrow in Furness as early as the late 2020s and is expected to be operational as early as the late 2030s. The Royal Navy boats will be built by BAE Systems. The SSN-AUKUS class will be powered by a Rolls-Royce pressurised water reactor (PWR). As of 2023, the workforce at Barrow in Furness was being expanded from 10,000 to 17,000 to support both the Dreadnought class program and the SSN-AUKUS class. 

The Royal Australian Navy will acquire eight SSN-AUKUS class boats that will be built at Osborne Naval Shipyard. The building of the first boat is to begin by the end of the 2030s with the boat delivered in the early 2040s. Five boats are expected to built by 2055 and the three final boats built by 2063 with a boat built every three years. The Australian Minister for Defence Richard Marles in March 2023 said that the Australian government would determine the builder "over the course of the next year". Australia will operate two submarine classes, and if the build schedule for the SSN-AUKUS falls behind, has the option of purchasing up to two additional Virginia boats from the United States. As a non-nuclear weapon state under the IAEA, "Australia will not produce nuclear fuel for its SSNs". The UK and US "intend to provide Australia with nuclear material in complete, welded nuclear power units".

In March 2023, Vice Admiral Jonathan Mead, head of the Australian Nuclear Powered Submarine Task Force, said the SSN-AUKUS design was "about 70 per cent mature".

The SSN-AUKUS class "will incorporate US technology such as propulsion plant systems and components, a common vertical launch system and weapons",  and "will have a high degree of commonality" with the Virginia class, including "sharing elements of the propulsion plant, combat system and weapons", enhancing interoperability and Australia's transition to SSN-AUKUS.

See also
 Canada-class submarine
 Future of the Royal Navy
 Future of the Royal Australian Navy
 Nuclear power in Australia
 SSN(X)-class submarine

References

Submarine classes
Ship classes of the Royal Navy
Proposed ships of the Royal Navy
United Kingdom defence procurement
Submarines of Australia
Ships built in South Australia